Calyptridium monandrum, synonym Cistanthe monandra, is a species of flowering plant in the family Montiaceae known by the common name common pussypaws.

The plant is native to the Southwestern United States, Southern California, and adjacent Baja California, where it grows in sandy areas such as deserts and coastal and mountain scrub habitats.

Description

Calyptridium monandrum is a fleshy, flat annual herb producing short stems which extend along the ground or spread upright from a small taproot. Thick, spoon-shaped leaves occur in a basal rosette at the base of the stem, reaching up to about 5 cm in length. There are smaller leaves along the stems.

Small inflorescences sprout from the stem bearing many flowers, each with fleshy, triangular sepals and three pink or red petals only a few millimeters long. The fruit is a translucent, oblong capsule up to six millimeters long containing several shiny, black seeds.

References

External links
Jepson Manual Treatment: Calyptridium monandrum
Cistanthe monandra — U.C. Photo gallery

Montiaceae
Flora of California
Flora of Baja California
Flora of Arizona
Flora of Nevada
Flora of the Sierra Nevada (United States)
Flora of the California desert regions
Flora of the Sonoran Deserts
Natural history of the California chaparral and woodlands
Natural history of the Central Valley (California)
Natural history of the Colorado Desert
Natural history of the Mojave Desert
Natural history of the Peninsular Ranges
Natural history of the Santa Monica Mountains
Natural history of the Transverse Ranges